Henry Bayly (born c. 1564) was a barrister of Lincoln's Inn and the member of the Parliament of England for Malmesbury for the parliaments of 1586 and 1589.

References 

Members of the Parliament of England for Malmesbury
Year of birth uncertain
1560s births
English barristers
English MPs 1586–1587
English MPs 1589
Year of death missing